No. 148 Squadron of the Royal Air Force has been part of the RAF since the First World War.

History

First World War
The squadron was formed at Andover Aerodrome on 10 February 1918, it moved to Ford Junction Aerodrome on 1 March 1918 where it was equipped with the Royal Aircraft Factory FE.2b and moved to France on 25 April 1918. It returned to the UK on 17 February 1919 and disbanded at Tangmere on 4 July 1919.

Second World War
It was reformed at RAF Scampton on 7 June 1937 with the Hawker Audax and the Vickers Wellesley and moved twice before being disbanded and merged into No. 15 Operational Training Unit on 8 April 1940.

With the expansion of the Royal Air Force Special Duties Service the unit was reformed in 1943 as No. 148 (Special Duties) Squadron. The unit's Halifaxes dropped supplies to partisans in southern France, Italy and the Balkans, while its flight of Lysanders under the command of Peter Vaughan-Fowler did agent pick-up operations to Greece, Yugoslavia and southern France. It participated in the Warsaw airlift, where it suffered heavy losses. The unit continued its work through the end of the war.

Cold War
No. 148 operated the Vickers Valiant nuclear bomber out of RAF Marham, Norfolk from 1 July 1956 until 1 May 1965.

Aircraft operated
Date of introduction of aircraft into 148 squadron:
 1918 – Royal Aircraft Factory FE.2b
 1937 – Hawker Audax
 1937 – Vickers Wellesley
 1938 – Handley Page Heyford III
 1939 – Vickers Wellington I
 1939 – Avro Anson I
 1940 – Vickers Wellington IC
 1941 – Vickers Wellington II
 1943 – Consolidated Liberator II
 1943 – Handley Page Halifax II
 1944 – Westland Lysander IIIA
 1944 – Handley Page Halifax V
 1944 – Short Stirling IV
 1945 – Consolidated Liberator VI
 1946 – Avro Lancaster B.1 (FE)
 1949 – Avro Lincoln B.2
 1956 – Vickers Valiant B1 and B(K).1
 1957 – Vickers Valiant B(PR).1
 1958 – Vickers Valiant B(PR)K.1

Records from 58RSU indicate 148 Sqdn also operated Blenheims as 58RSU carried out an engine change on Blenheim Z6157 of 148 Sqdn at Maryut in July 1943, after which it was flown to Heliopolis.

References

Citations

Bibliography

External links

 
 148 Squadron (Special duties-SOE) RAF Commemorative Website
 RAF Web Air of Authority

Royal Flying Corps squadrons
Royal Air Force aircraft squadrons
Military units and formations established in 1918
1918 establishments in the United Kingdom